Señorita Aruba is the national Beauty pageant in Aruba. The two brands; Miss Teen Aruba and Srta. Aruba are registered and are under management of Miss Aruba Foundation

History
A TV Personality and Producer, Isaï Labadie introduced the Miss Aruba Foundation which held the Srta. Aruba and Miss Teen Aruba. The foundation in unrelated to Star Promotion Foundation  (Miss Aruba Universe, Miss Aruba World, Miss Aruba Grand.)

Purposes
The main purpose of Miss Aruba Foundation is to prepare all the candidates, regardless of social standards, on the same level. the foundation is the only pageant on the island that tries to minimize the costs of participating in a pageant by helping the candidate as much as possible, thanks to your generous help. The winner will represent Aruba in the Miss International Pageant in Japan while the first runner-up will represent the island in Philippines at the Miss Earth competition.

Titleholders

International pageants
MISS ARUBA FOUNDATION The pageant will choose the delegates for Miss International and Miss Earth pageants. Before 2011, traditionally the 2nd Runner-up of Star Promotion Foundation Miss Aruba will represent her country at the Miss International pageant. In 2011, Aruba made a debut at Miss Earth. The Star Promotion Foundation sends a delegate to represent Aruba at Miss Earth. In 2011, Mellisa Lacle was appointed to compete at the pageant, she was Miss Aruba 2005 who competed at Miss Universe 2006 in Nevada, USA.

Miss Aruba International
Color key

Miss Aruba Earth
Color key

References

External links 
Srta-Aruba

Beauty pageants in Aruba
Recurring events established in 2012
Dutch awards